Lady Marion's Summer Flirtation is a 1913 Swedish silent drama film directed by Victor Sjöström.

Cast
 Hilda Borgström as Lady Marion
 Victor Lundberg as Viktor
 Richard Lund as Lord Handsome
 Axel Ringvall as Axel Pärzon

References

External links

1913 films
1913 drama films
1913 short films
1910s Swedish-language films
Swedish black-and-white films
Swedish silent short films
Films directed by Victor Sjöström
Swedish drama films
Silent drama films